Lipstick feminism is a variety of feminism that seeks to embrace traditional concepts of femininity, including the sexual power of women, alongside traditional feminist ideas. The concept emerged within the third-wave as a response to ideals created by previous movements, where women felt that they could not both be feminine and a feminist.

Unlike the early feminist campaigns that focused on the basic fundamental rights of women, starting with the Women's Suffrage Movement, lipstick feminism seeks to prove that women can still be feminists without ignoring or negating their femininity and sexuality. During the second wave of feminism, feminists focused solely on the legal and social equality of women. Feminists of this era refused to 'embrace' their sexuality. Some second wave feminists abhorred the idea of men. As a result, they would often take on physical male characteristics and a persona that was far from what the average woman looked like. This created the stereotype of feminism, and the stereotypical imagery of what a feminist should look like. 

Despite the stereotypes surrounding feminism and the dominate social narratives surrounding feminism during their time, women like Zora Neale Hurston and Emma Goldman argued that by using philosophical ideas of aesthetics and ideas of femininity, it is possible to empower and analyze the ways that gender works in everyday life. Lipstick feminism embraces the ideals of womanhood and the sensualities of a woman. Scholars of lipstick feminism believe that women have a right to act in accordance with passion and sexuality. In one sense, the successes of second-wave feminism made it possible to reclaim aspects of femininity that were seen as disempowering, like make-up or stilettos.

History 
Lipstick feminism is a movement created of the third wave of feminism, following second wave feminism.  The second wave of feminism emerged in the US around 1960. This wave challenged America's beauty industry and its standards by protesting in a boycott of items considered to be feminine. These items included bras, girdles, curlers, false eye lashes, and magazines catered to women. Boycotting these items as well as embracing unorthodox appearances of women, such as unshaved legs and wearing no makeup, became a liberation mark for the second wave feminists. From early literature to date, the appearance of femininity has always had a negative relationship with feminism. During the eighteenth century, writings of Wollstonecraft criticized women who focused on their beauty, calling them "feather birds" with nothing to do besides plume themselves. Some time after, Simone de Beauvoir implored women to go beyond their bodies by rejecting emotional responses and the superficiality of beauty. De Beauvoir urged that this was the way to equality for women. Fashion, glamour and beauty have always been viewed as superficial and problematic. Second wave feminism viewed these as bondage, being oppressive and exploitative.

Third wave feminism was birthed out of the demands of the second wave of feminism. Women wanted to continue to fight for equality and to continue their activist work, while not fitting into the box of what society felt a feminist should look like. While second wave feminism focused more on political activism and pushing the beauty ideals away, lipstick feminism embraced both beauty standards and political activisms.

Criticisms 
Nineteen and early twentieth century debates criticized the practice of doing things to change or improve one’s appearance. People of the time believed that beauty and virtue were intertwined, so to focus on one’s beauty was abandoning the improvement of one’s virtue. Sentiments began to change once marketing made "paint and powder" cosmetics more easily accessible. The stigma around beauty practices started to diminish, and began being seen as a form of self expression as well as improving one’s chances to be desired for a marriage.

Language 
This movement not only worked to physically empower feminists, but linguistically as well. Lipstick feminism embraces double-standard insults by redefining their meaning and to eliminate the social stigma applied to a woman whose sexual behavior was "patriarchally" interpreted to denote "immoral woman" and libertine. This is seen with words such as:

- Chick: first used to describe women as literal chicks with the implication of cowardice and fragility, transformed into a word with the connotation of property to men. The word was applied in literature with ironic uses as a way to target the patriarchal standards set for women, creating chick literature heroines within works such as Sex and the City.

- Bitch: lipstick feminists recognize that this word is often used towards outspoken women who do not shy away from expressing themselves thus seeing it more positively.

- Slut: as lipstick feminists fight for sexual liberation, reclaiming the word slut has been imperative as it has always been used as a double-standard when discussing sexuality amongst men and women. The reclaiming of this word has helped to spur the transnational movement of the SlutWalk.

These are a few words among many, and by using linguistics to empower the movement the abrasiveness is being removed from these words, thus ensuring these labels are no longer pejorative. This redefining developed, in part, as a response to the ideological backlash against radical varieties of second-wave feminism. Redefining terms were also influenced from the negative stereotypes generated during the second wave of feminism, such as "ugly feminist" or the "anti-sex feminist". In one sense, the successes of second-wave feminism made it possible to reclaim aspects of femininity that were seen as disempowering, like make-up or stilettos.

Philosophy  

Philosophically, lipstick feminism proposes that a woman can be empowered – psychologically, socially, politically – by the wearing of cosmetic make up, sensually-appealing clothes, and the embrace of sexual allure for her own self-image as a confidently sexual being. The rhetoric of choice and empowerment is used to validate such overt sexual practices, because they no longer represent coerced acquiescence to societally established gender roles, such as "the good girl," "the decent woman," "the abnegated mother," or "the virtuous sister" et aliæ.

Other feminists object that the so-called empowerment of lipstick feminism is a philosophic contradiction wherein a woman chooses to sexually objectify herself, and so ceases to be her own woman, in control neither of her self nor of her person. Feminist scholars have often discussed whether or not the decision to perform traditional gendered actions, such as shaving your legs and wearing short skirts can be considered an act of empowerment. Feminist scholars like Fionnghuala Sweeney and Kathy Davis argue that there is a freedom that can come from understanding and embracing gender norms of sexuality as a means of freeing yourself from the stereotypes of women in society. Lipstick feminism counter-proposes that the practice of sexual allure is a form of social power in the interpersonal relations between a man and a woman, which may occur in the realms of cultural, social, and gender equality. Scholars have pointed out the contradictions between feminist viewpoints and traditional gender roles. Scholar Kathy Davis wrote, "feminist scholars need to ground their normative, theoretical critique of passion in a grounded analysis of what the experience of passion feels like and what it means to those who have it, but it also suggests contradictions between feminist theory and embodied experience are a useful starting point for reflecting critically on some of the silences within feminist theory itself."

Stiletto feminism
Stiletto feminism, a more ideologically radical variety of lipstick feminism, sees the postmodern use of fetish fashion as empowering; and extends the argument from the acceptance of makeup, to the validity of women practicing occupations specifically predicated upon female physical beauty, such as working as a striptease dancer or as a pole dancer, as well as flashing or sapphic exhibitionism.

Lipstick Feminism in Media 

Lipstick feminism has become one of the most prominent feminist themes within film, especially in the 2000s. Many of these pieces of media often depict these heroines as using their femininity to their advantage, and a refusal to conform to more normative standards that would force them to become less feminine.
This movement is represented in the film Legally Blonde as it follows a former sorority girl, Elle, who gets a Juris Doctor degree from Harvard Law School, overcoming the stereotypes against blondes and triumphs as a successful lawyer without giving up her feminine qualities. She first attends law school in the hopes of getting back together with an ex-boyfriend, but she finds her passion for law and becomes serious about it. As she buckles down other students give her a hard time about how she looks and the slang she uses when she speaks, but this did not deter her as she would continue partaking in feminine acts such as getting her nails done and wearing elaborate outfits. A scene depicts one of her law professors encouraging her to apply for an internship and she hands him a pink and scented resume, a clear representation of her shamelessly using femininity as a strength.

Sex and the City, although having received some feminist critique, is one of the first television shows to unapologetically depict female sexual autonomy and critique the narrative surrounding traditional relationships. The series follows the lives of four women living within New York City, navigating their relationships and sex lives together while tackling themes such as safe sex, promiscuity, and femininity. Each woman is challenging societal expectations and depicts qualities that television shows strayed away from at the time. Carrie, the lead, was presented as an everywoman figure with her anxieties, insecurities, and emotional needs on the forefront. Charlotte was a representation of traditional ideals as she yearned for marriage and was the least promiscuous, a quintessential hopeless romantic. Miranda was a direct and fiery lawyer who often was distrustful of the men in her life. Samantha was the oldest, in her forties while the others in their thirties, and she was the most promiscuous and confident in herself as a businesswoman. While it may take patriarchal discussions to the extreme at times, it is a key piece of media in furthering sexual liberation and sex positivity, a vibrant representation of what lipstick feminism is about. The depictions of excessive and complex breakups, career-oriented women, owning of sexuality, and the blunt dialogue all exhibit feminist ideals that broke through societal barriers at the time of release in 1998.

See also

References

Further reading 
 F. R. Levy, Female Chauvinist Pigs (2005).
 Sylvia Walby, The Future of Feminism (2011).
 Reflections on Non-Imperialist, Feminist Values, Meyers (2021)
 Feminism and Futurity: Geographies of resistance, resilience and reworking, MacLeavy, Fanning, Larner.
 This is What a Feminist Looks Like: Identification and Exploration of the Factors Underlying the Concept of Feminism and Predicting the Endorsement of Traditional Gender Role Kaitlyn McLaughlin, Shelley Aikman

External links 
 "Lipstick Feminists", by Elizabeth Austin. Washington Monthly, Nov, 1998.
 "Lipstick helped feminism"
 Banana Powder UK

Lipstick
Femininity
Feminist theory
Third-wave feminism
Feminist movements and ideologies
Cultural studies
Feminism and sexuality
Underground culture